James Burlton Mathews (1 June 1968 – 24 December 1992) was a rugby league footballer in the New South Wales Rugby League (NSWRL) competition.

Mathews attended the Yanco Agricultural College, before being signed by the Illawarra Steelers rugby league side in 1988 where he played until joining the Eastern Suburbs club in 1992. Mathews also headed the Roosters points scoring list that year. His career goal kicking average was 71.89%.

The promising young centre was killed in a car accident on 24 December 1992. The Sydney Roosters now name their Club Player of the year in his honour.

References 

1968 births
1992 deaths
Australian rugby league players
Sydney Roosters players
Illawarra Steelers players
Road incident deaths in New South Wales
Rugby league centres
Rugby league players from New South Wales